The 2015–16 Biathlon World Cup was a multi-race tournament over a season of biathlon, organised by the International Biathlon Union. The season began on 29 November 2015 in Östersund, Sweden, and ended on 19 March 2016 in Khanty-Mansiysk, Russia.
The defending overall champions from the 2014–15 Biathlon World Cup were Martin Fourcade of France and Darya Domracheva of Belarus, but Domracheva missed the season due to illness.

Calendar
Below is the IBU World Cup calendar for the 2015–16 season.

Men

World Cup Podiums

Men's Relay Podiums

Standings

Overall

Individual

Sprint

Pursuit

Mass start

Relay

Nation

Women

World Cup Podiums

Women's Relay Podiums

Standings

Overall

Individual

Sprint

Pursuit

Mass start

Relay

Nation

Mixed

Standings: Mixed

Mixed relay

Final standings after 5 races.

Medal table

Achievements
First World Cup career victory

Men
 , 27, in his 9th season — the WC 3 Mass Start in Pokljuka; first podium was 2013–14 Pursuit in Antholz-Anterselva
 , 26, in his 9th season — the WC 7 Mass Start in Canmore; it also was his first podium
 , 29, in his 8th season — the WC 9 Sprint in Khanty-Mansiysk; it also was his first podium

Women
 , 25, in her 6th season — the WC 1 Individual in Östersund; first podium was 2013–14 Pursuit in Pokljuka
 , 28, in her 5th season — the WC 2 Sprint in Hochfilzen; first podium was 2014–15 Sprint in Nové Město
 , 23, in her 4th season — the WC 6 Sprint in Antholz-Anterselva; first podium was 2014–15 Pursuit in Hochfilzen

First World Cup podium

Men
 , 24, in his 4th season — no. 2 in the WC 6 Sprint in Antholz-Anterselva
 , 26, in his 9th season — no. 1 WC 7 Mass Start in Canmore
 , 29, in his 8th season — no. 1 in the WC 9 Sprint in Khanty-Mansiyk

Women
 , 25, in her 3rd season — no. 2 in the WC 1 Sprint in Östersund
 , 26, in her 4th season — no. 2 in the WC 2 Sprint in Hochfilzen
 , 25, in her 3rd season — no. 3 in the WC 9 Sprint in Khanty-Mansiysk

Victory in this World Cup (all-time number of victories in parentheses)

Men
 , 10 (47) first places
 , 5 (10) first places
 , 3 (11) first places
 , 1 (94) first place
 , 1 (8) first place
 , 1 (3) first place
 , 1 (2) first place
 , 1 (1) first place
 , 1 (1) first place
 , 1 (1) first place

Women
 , 5 (7) first places
 , 4 (19) first places
 , 4 (12) first places
 , 3 (5) first places
 , 3 (3) first places
 , 2 (2) first places
 , 1 (2) first place
 , 1 (2) first place
 , 1 (2) first place
 , 1 (1) first place

Retirements

Men

Women

Footnotes

References

External links
IBU official site
IBU Guide 2015–16 season (PDF)
RealBiathlon - statistics and analyses

 
Biathlon World Cup
2015 in biathlon
2016 in biathlon